is a 2007 Japanese film directed by Meiji Fujita. It is based on Yoshi's novel of the same title. The lead star is Masakazu Tamura. Tamura appeared in the movie for the first time in 14 years. Tamura made his final appeaerence in the film. Ending theme song Jewelry Day was sung by Ayaka.

Plot
Akira Akira was a sax player in New York, but retired from it because of his wife's sudden death. One day, Akira Agawa meets Yui Uehara, a young woman who works for the cleaning station, and eventually reunite in New York. Since then, they have opened up their hearts and are gradually attracted to each other.

Cast
Masakazu Tamura as Akira Agawa
Misaki Ito as Yui Uehara
Reiko Takashima as Tomomi Agawa
Ei Morisako as Sawa Agawa
Tsurutaro Kataoka as Daigo Asakura
Yoon Son-ha as Lee Rei
Shigeki Hosokawa as Daiki Sakahara

References

External links

Films scored by Michiru Ōshima
2000s Japanese films